Thomas Woodrow Thrash Jr. (born May 8, 1951) is a Senior Judge of the United States District Court for the Northern District of Georgia.

Education and career

Born in Birmingham, Alabama, Thrash received a Bachelor of Arts degree from the University of Virginia in 1973 and a Juris Doctor from Harvard Law School in 1976. He was in private practice in Atlanta, Georgia from 1976 to 1977. He was then an assistant district attorney of Fulton County District Attorney's Office until 1980. He resumed his private practice in Atlanta from 1981 to 1997. He was a Law professor at Georgia State University from 1986 to 1997.

Federal judicial service

On January 7, 1997, Thrash was nominated by President Bill Clinton to a seat on the United States District Court for the Northern District of Georgia vacated by Robert L. Vining Jr. Thrash was confirmed by the United States Senate on July 31, 1997, and received his commission on August 1, 1997. He became Chief Judge on July 31, 2014. He assumed senior status on May 8, 2021.

Sources

1951 births
Living people
20th-century American judges
21st-century American judges
Georgia State University faculty
Harvard Law School alumni
Judges of the United States District Court for the Northern District of Georgia
Lawyers from Birmingham, Alabama
University of Virginia alumni
United States district court judges appointed by Bill Clinton